Expatica is an online news and information portal that specifically serves English-speaking expatriates and the international community. It was founded by Canadian Bram Lebo in 2000. Expatica's content has always been produced and managed by expatriates for expatriates.

Background
Expatica's mission is to help expats in Europe settle into their new country of residence by providing up-to-date news and information in the English language.

Expatica's founding was partially funded by the Dutch government (the Twinning Center under the Ministry of Economic Affairs) and Expatica now reaches expats in ten European countries and regions, including the Netherlands, Belgium, France, Germany, Spain, Switzerland, Moscow, Luxembourg, the UK, Portugal and South Africa. The news and information Expatica supplies covers various aspects of expat life, including relocation, culture, education, tax, immigration, local events and politics.

Expatica allows expats from any country to register as members free of charge, which has resulted in an online international community, comprising over 120,000 members. Via the “I am not a tourist” fairs organised annually in Amsterdam, Brussels and Madrid, along with regular meet-ups and social events, Expatica brings members of the international community together.

Expatica assists academic institutions and independent researchers in carrying out research on expat-related subjects too. To date, various surveys have been conducted in co-operation with Expatica, including an investigation into expatriation by Cranfield School of Management.

Expatica receives, on average, 700,000-800,000 visits every month. The Guardian describes Expatica as a provider of "excellent news and analysis aimed at the English-speaking community".

References

External links 
 

Dutch social networking websites
Dutch news websites
Internet properties established in 2000
Expatriates